Time Within Itself is a big band jazz album produced by Origin Records and released March 17, 2015.  The concept for the recording came from the idea of a high level feature CD showcasing the Michael Waldrop Big Band.  Most notably, music critic Jack Bowers gave the recording 4 and a half of 5 stars and notes, "...Waldrop's first visit to a recording studio with his own big band was worth the wait."

Background 
Early in 2013 Michael Waldrop forwarded a portfolio of songs (jazz instrumentals) to Jack Cooper in order to commission big band arrangements.  After Cooper arrived back from a trip to England in the Summer or 2013 he was finally able to assess the tunes and make some decisions.  Because of the high quality of Waldrop's compositions it was suggested he try to pursue a whole commercial CD that would feature Waldrop.  A substantial grant ($10,000) was obtained by Waldrop from Eastern Washington University to doing a CD.

Both a commercial big band CD and a 'Music Minus One' (for students drummers) types of projects were pursued.  Due to the complexity of having both types of recordings and the many cost prohibitive factors involved, the decision was made to recorded during the Summer of 2014 in Dallas, Texas.  The studio used was Crystal Clear Sound located in the northern part of the city. Soon after that recording session on July 11, 2014, John Bishop at Origin Records was approached about carrying the CD as a commercial recording (two other labels were in the running for this).  The level of artists used on the recording was very high: many of these musicians are both established recording artists and full-time college educators.

Track listing

Recording 
 July 11, 2014

Recorded at Crystal Clear Sound, Dallas, Texas.

Personnel

Musicians 
Conductor, arranger, composer: Jack Cooper 
Alto Saxophone/flute/clarinet/soprano sax: Will Campbell
Alto Saxophone/flute/clarinet: Tim Ishii
Tenor Saxophone/flute/clarinet/soprano sax: Larry Panella
Tenor Saxophone/clarinet: Chris McGuire
Baritone Saxophone/bass clarinet: Paul Baker
Trumpet and flugelhorn: Keith Jourdan (lead), David Spencer, Larry Spencer, Mike Steinel
Trombone: Anthony Williams (lead), Tony Baker, Greg Waits, John Wasson (bass) 
Guitar: Chris DeRose
Piano: Steve Snyder
Bass: Carl Hillman
Drums and Vibraphone: Mike Waldrop
Guitar/Vocal : Jimi Tunnell (guitar on tracks 2,6,7 vocals on track 2)
Guitar: Chad McLoughlin (guitar on track 3)
Vocal: Sandra Dudley (on tracks 6 & 7)
Percussion: José Rossy (on tracks 2,4,5,6,7)

Production 

Executive Producer: John Bishop
Producer: Michael Waldrop
Associate Producers: Jimi Tunnell, Jack Cooper, Tim Reppert 
Recording engineer: Kent Stump at Crystal Clear Sound, July 11, 2014
Recording engineer (additional and overdubs): Jimi Tunnell
Editing and mix engineer: Tim Reppert at Soundtrack Studios, Boston and REP Studio, Ithaca, NY.
Mastering: Robert Vosgien at Capitol Records, Los Angeles 
Liner notes: Bill Milkowski
Cover design and layout: John Bishop
Cover Painting: Laurin Rinder
Liner photographs: Daniel Pardo and Ivana Ćojbašić
Jimi Tunnell vocal and guitar was recorded at Buffalo Sound in Denton, Texas, August 2014
Vibraphone was recorded at Michael Lewis Music in Spokane WA, July 18, 2014
Sandra Dudley was recorded in Nashville, Tennessee, August 8, 2014 by Brendan Harkin at Wildwood Recording.

Promotion 
The 'Time Within Itself' CD was premiered in Memphis, Tennessee, on March 7, 2015, by the Jazz Orchestra of the Delta as part of the University of Memphis Jazz Week performances.  The album had its Northwest U.S. premiere on July 27, 2015, at Tula's Jazz Club in Seattle, Washington with the Northwest version of the Michael Waldrop Big Band.  Waldrop and his big band were invited to perform the album at the Jazz Education Network International Conference in Louisville, Kentucky  on January 9, 2016.  The original ensemble from the recording performed; included were guest artists Brad Dutz and Billy Hulting.  The music from the Time Within Itself CD has acquired significant international recognition to include other groups playing the music.  The Swingin' Paradise Jazz Orchestra in Tokyo, Japan performed Tunnell Vision on July 18, 2016, at Musasino Big Band Jazz Festival.

Advertisements were run in both Down Beat Magazine and JazzTimes in the March issues (2015) for Origin Records to feature the CD. Drumhead Magazine published a two part feature of transcribed solos and drums parts from the 'Time Within Itself' CD starting with the June 2015 (#50) edition. Origin Records submitted the TWI CD into the first round ballot of the 58th Annual Grammy Awards for the categories of Best Arrangement Instrumental or a Cappella, Best Large Jazz Ensemble Album, and Best Instrumental Composition.  Most recently the entire album was featured on Scott Ellsworth's long running Scott's Place jazz radio show for February 2, 2019.

Reception 

'"Time Within Itself” is the rare large ensemble recording that builds upon tradition but never sounds retro. Smart, carefully plotted arrangements, crisp, thoughtful solos, surprises at every turn and a consistently solid groove result in a big band set for people who never thought they’d like big band music.'

Jeff Tamarkin, Associate Editor, JazzTimes magazine

'“Time Within Itself” is a state-of-the-art modern large jazz ensemble project that I highly recommend. Made up of some of my favorite people in the Dallas Fort Worth area as well as some imports, this band is magnificent. Standouts to me were Mike's wonderful drums and the thrilling guitar of Jimi Tunnell. When you add Sandra's (Dudley) voice to the mix, you get a great 21st Century texture that lifts this project up into the contemporary sizzle zone! I really enjoyed the masterful orchestrations and developmental writing of Jack Cooper. He has really developed a musical palette that can tell a story in a very evocative manner. Great stuff one-and-all!'

Steve Wiest, multiple Grammy-nominated, multi-genre artist.

"Impeccable performance, great charts, a fresh new sound. Bravo!"

Chris Walden, 6 time Grammy nominated composer/arranger, for film, T.V. and numerous recording artists

"It is always refreshing to hear new original big band music. Michael Waldrop and Jack Cooper have struck a great balance on their new album from Origin Records; ‘Time With Itself.’ Nothing drives a band better than a drummer playing his own music; there is a special groove that comes out that feels just right. However, without great arrangements the music might turn into one long, funky drum solo; that is for sure not the case here. Cooper's colorful and inventive arrangements bring all the tunes to life, showcasing his style while bringing the out the best in Waldrop's tunes."

Tim Davies, Grammy-nominated composer, orchestrator, and drummer.

Charts

Release history

See also
Origin Records
Jack Cooper
List of jazz arrangers

References

External links

Time Within Itself at Origin Records
 Time Within Itself' at All Music Guide 

Michael Waldrop's website

2015 albums
Jazz albums by American artists
Big band albums
Instrumental albums